Dental caries, also known as tooth decay, is uncommon among companion animals. The bacteria Streptococcus mutans and Streptococcus sanguis cause dental caries by metabolising sugars.  Prehistoric primates eating fruit suffer from cavities.

The term feline cavities is commonly used to refer to feline odontoclastic resorptive lesions, however, saccharolytic acid-producing bacteria (the same responsible for Dental plaque) are not involved in this condition.

In dogs 
Although rarely seen in cats, the incidence of caries in dogs has been estimated at 5%. Dogs are less likely than humans to have tooth decay due to the very high pH of dog saliva, which prevents an acidic environment from forming and the subsequent demineralization of enamel which would occur.

Symptoms 
Even if dental caries in dogs gets often recognized very late there are some symptoms that could adumbrate an infestation. Reddened and swollen of gum or its decline could be symptoms for dental caries as well as bloody saliva. Other signs for an infestation are like humans. This includes a discolouration of teeth, an accumulation of calculus and halitosis. Furthermore, one-sided chewing, an increase of scratching in the face and renunciation of solid food could be signs for dental caries.

Reasons for dental caries 
A main reason for dental caries in dogs is unfavourable shape or positioning of the teeth, as well as the intake of foods which contain sugar.

It is already proven that some dogs are more susceptible to dental caries than others. Thus, it is likely dogs with an infestation are more delicate for more infestations.

Formation of dental caries 
The formation of dental caries in dogs can be divided in two stages:

The demineralisation of the inorganic part of the tooth is described as the first stage. Even though the jaw of the carnivore is scissor-like shaped to prevent residues, dental caries is mainly caused by leftover, sugar-containing, food in small notches of teeth or interdental space. In the long run, this can cause dissolution of the inorganic substance of the teeth. Within this procedure the dentine is the most susceptible and vulnerable part of the teeth which suffers the most damage. In severe cases the bacteria infest the enamel, which then need to be removed.In comparison to humans the enamel layer in dogs is way thinner than in humans (2–3 mm) by a broadness up to 0.6 mm.

In the second phase, the dentine gets dissolved which causes a cave in the enamel. The most cases of dental caries in dogs get recognized in later stadiums, because of the underground formation.

Treatment options 
If a tooth is infected by dental caries there are mainly two options of treatment:

In most of the veterinary clinics, teeth with an infestation of dental caries get extracted.Nevertheless, there are also specialized vets that can save teeth from an extraction. If there remains enough enamel the tooth can be repaired. In case of an infestation of the tooth pulp a treatment of the root canal is needed.

References

Dog diseases
Acquired tooth disorders